Alexandra Asimaki (born 28 June 1988) is a Greek water polo player considered one of the best female water polo players in the world in the 21st century.

Asimaki was part of the Greece women's national water polo team awarded the Gold Medal at the 2011 World Championship which took place in Shanghai in July 2011. After her outstanding performance in this tournament, she was named best European and World Female Water Polo Player of the Year 2011.

Club career
 2004–2006 Nautical Club of Vouliagmeni
 2006–2007 CN Ciudad de Alcorcón
 2007–2014 Nautical Club of Vouliagmeni
 2014–2020 Olympiacos Piraeus
 2022-today Olympiacos Alimou

Club honours

Vouliagmeni

 2 LEN Champions Cups
 2009 and 2010.
 2 LEN Super Cups
 2009 and 2010.
 5 Greek Championships
 2005, 2006, 2010, 2012 and 2013.

Olympiacos
 1 LEN Euro League
 2015.
 1 LEN Super Cup
 2015.
 6 Greek Championships
 2015, 2016, 2017, 2018, 2019 and 2020.
 2 Greek Cups
 2018 and 2020.

Alcorcón
 1 Spanish Cup
 2007.

National team honours
  Gold medals
 World Championship (1): 2011.
 World League (1): 2005.
 Europa Cup (1): 2018.
  Silver medals
 European Championship (3): 2010, 2012 and 2018.
  Bronze medals
 World League (2): 2010 and 2012.
 Mediterranean Games (1): 2018.

Individual awards
 FINA World Water Polo Player of the Year
 2011
 LEN European Water Polo Player of the Year
 2011

See also
 List of world champions in women's water polo
 List of World Aquatics Championships medalists in water polo

References

External links
 
 Alexandra Asimaki – athlete profile at Olympiacos SFP website
 

1988 births
Living people
Greek female water polo players
Olympiacos Women's Water Polo Team players
Olympic water polo players of Greece
Water polo players at the 2008 Summer Olympics
World Aquatics Championships medalists in water polo
Competitors at the 2018 Mediterranean Games
Mediterranean Games bronze medalists for Greece
Mediterranean Games medalists in water polo
Water polo players from Athens
21st-century Greek women